This is a list of Ukrainian billionaires based on an annual assessment of wealth and assets compiled and published by Forbes magazine in 2022.

2022 Ukrainian billionaires list

See also
 Ukrainian oligarchs (including a 2019 list of richest Ukrainians and an economic study identifying  the 35 oligarchic groups between 2002 – 2016)
 The World's Billionaires
 List of countries by the number of billionaires

References

Lists of people by wealth
Net worth
 
Economy of Ukraine-related lists